The Church of Jesus Christ of Latter-day Saints in Pennsylvania refers to the Church of Jesus Christ of Latter-day Saints (LDS Church) and its members in Pennsylvania. Joseph and Emma Smith lived in Northern Pennsylvania near the Susquehanna River just prior to the organization of the LDS Church. Much of the translation of the Book of Mormon and revelation of the Priesthood occurred here during that time.

Official church membership as a percentage of general population was 0.40% in 2014. According to the 2014 Pew Forum on Religion & Public Life survey, less than 1% of Pennsylvanians self-identify themselves most closely with the LDS Church. The LDS Church is the 13th largest denomination in Pennsylvania.

History

Joseph Smith and the first members of the Church were baptized in the Susquehanna River in May 1829.

A total of 12 congregations were organized in Pennsylvania in the 1830s, before members gathered to Ohio, Missouri, and Illinois.

In 2016 Inga Saffron, architecture critic for The Philadelphia Inquirer, called the new Philadelphia Pennsylvania Temple "the most radical work of architecture built in Philadelphia in a half-century ... because it dares to be so out of step with today's design sensibilities and our bottom-line culture." Estimating its cost as more than $100 million, she wrote that the temple was "the real classical deal" and "a bold incursion into the hierarchical fabric of Philadelphia".

Stakes

As of February 2023, Pennsylvania had the following stakes (with the stake center in Pennsylvania):

Missions
 Pennsylvania Philadelphia Mission
 Pennsylvania Pittsburgh Mission

Temples

The Philadelphia Pennsylvania Temple was announced on October 4, 2008, by church president Thomas S. Monson.

References

Further reading

External links

 Newsroom (Pennsylvania)
 ComeUntoChrist.org Latter-day Saints Visitor site
 The Church of Jesus Christ of Latter-day Saints Official site